NGC 1624-2 is a massive O-type star located in the star cluster NGC 1624, in the constellation of Perseus, about 16,800 light years away. NGC 1624-2 is notable for being most strongly magnetised O-type star known, with a magnetic field strength of 20 kG, or about 20,000 times the Sun's magnetic field strength. It hosts a large and dense magnetosphere, formed from the interaction between its very strong magnetic field and its dense, radiatively-driven stellar wind, which also absorbs up to 95% of x-rays generated from around the star.

Properties 
NGC 1624-2 is a very massive, young, blue star no more than 4 million years old. It is an Of?p star a type of highly magnetic star that has unusual emission lines of multiply-ionized carbon and nitrogen. In NGC 1624-2, the carbon emission is particularly extreme.  The luminosity class is uncertain because of the unusual spectrum; it is most commonly given as V (main sequence), but has also been given as I (supergiant).

However, this assumes that NGC 1624-2 is a normal star, while it is not, so it should only be taken as an indication of its true mass. NGC 1624-2 is currently losing mass at a rate of /year, through a stellar wind with a terminal velocity of 2,875 km/s.

Rotation 
NGC 1624-2 rotates very slowly, only once every 316 days. This slow rotation is typical for very magnetic O-type stars as their magnetic fields slow down their rotation in a process known as magnetic braking, where angular momentum is quickly shed by the stellar wind via the strong magnetic field, which also minimises mass loss throughout the main sequence.

References 

O-type main-sequence stars
Perseus (constellation)
J04403728+5027410